Pishachini is an Indian Hindi-language television supernatural drama series that aired from 8 August 2022 to 13 January 2023 on Colors TV. It is digitally available on Voot. Produced by Shakuntalam Telefilms and MAJ Productions, it stars Nyra Banerjee, Jiya Shankar and Harsh Rajput.

Premise 
The show set against the backdrop of Bareilly where a beautiful girl (actually a Pishachini) named Rani seeks revenge from the Rajput family for settling on her land.

Cast

Main 
 Nyra Banerjee as Raat Rani / Rani Singh Rajput – A Pishachini, Rakshit's former fiancée, Sanchit's wife
 Jiya Shankar as Pavithra "Piku" Bose Singh Rajput – Pandit Ji's grand daughter, Kanika's niece, Rakshit's wife 
 Harsh Rajput as Rakshit "Rocky" Singh Rajput – Sudhakar and Sapna's son, Shikha and Sanchit's brother, Pavithra's husband, Rani's former fiancé

Recurring 
Shrey Mittal as Veer - A Mahapishach
 Raymon Singh as Kanika Sharma/Nashak - Pandit Ji's daughter, Pavithra's aunt
Amit Mehra as Sanchit Singh Rajput - Shikha and Rakshit's elder brother; Rani's husband
 Sushil Parashar as Ayodhya Singh Rajput – Sudhakar, Manohar and Prateek's father; Sanchit, Shikha, Rakshit, Nikita and Vidya's grandfather Rani's puppet (Dead)
 Sachin Parikh as Sudhakar Ayodhya Singh Rajput – Ayodhya's son; Sapna's husband; Shikha, Sanchit and Rakshit's father 
 Anjali Gupta as Sapna Rajput – Sudhakar's wife; Shikha, Sanchit and Rakshit's mother 

 Sagar Rambhia as Manohar Rajput – Ayodhya's son; Babbli's husband; Vidya's father 
 Jhumma Mitra as Babbli Rajput – Manohar's wife; Vidya's mother 
 Rutuja Sawant as Shikha Rajput – Sudhakar and Sapna's daughter; Rakshit and Sanchit's sister; Nikita and Vidya's cousin; Rani's puppet
 Meghna Kukreja as Vidya Rajput – Manohar and Babbli's daughter; Shikha, Sanchit, Nikita and Rakshit's cousin 
 Priyank Tatariya as Prateek Rajput – Ayodhya's son; Amrita's husband; Nikita's father; Rani's puppet (Dead)
 Shweta Dadhich as Amrita Rajput – Prateek's wife; Nikita's mother; Rani's puppet (Dead)
 Saumya Saraswat as Nikita Rajput – Prateek and Amrita's daughter; Sanchit, Shikha, Rakshit and Vidya's cousin 
 Raghav Binani as Mandy – A humanified Frog; Rani's puppet and helper 
 Amit Behl as Pandit Ji – Rajput family's helper; Pavithra's grandfather (Dead) 
 Garima Dixit as Himani – Sanchit's fiancée; Rani's puppet (Dead)
 Farukh Khan – Himani and Vikas's father; Rani's puppet and fake father (Dead)
 Reshma Merchant as Suddha – Himani and Vikas's mother; Rani's puppet and fake mother (Dead)

Production

Casting 
In June 2022, Nyra Banerjee was cast for the title role. Jiya Shankar finalized for a female protagonist.

Filming
The shooting of the series began in June 2022.

Release
On 19 June 2022, the first teaser featuring Nyra Banerjee as Pishachini released.

Airing
Show was initially planned as Finite Series Of 100 Episodes But,Due To Internal Factors Show was extended for Few Weeks.

References

External links
 Production Website

Indian fantasy television series
2022 Indian television series debuts
Hindi-language television shows
Indian drama television series
Colors TV original programming
Television shows set in Mumbai
Indian horror fiction television series
Indian supernatural television series